Dănicei is a commune located in Vâlcea County, Muntenia, Romania. It is composed of thirteen villages: Bădeni, Ceretu, Cireșul, Dealu Lăunele (the commune centre), Dealu Scheiului, Dobrești, Drăgulești, Glodu, Gura Crucilor, Lăunele de Jos, Linia pe Vale, Udrești and Valea Scheiului.

References

Communes in Vâlcea County
Localities in Muntenia